Fenyvesi is a Hungarian surname. Notable people with the surname include:

Csaba Fenyvesi (1943–2015), Hungarian fencer
László Fenyvesi (1908–1993), Hungarian football player and manager 
Máté Fenyvesi (born 1933), Hungarian football player

Hungarian-language surnames